Gebrehiwot is both a surname and a given name. Notable people with the name include:

Eleni Gebrehiwot (born 1984), German long-distance runner
Mulugeta Gebrehiwot, peace researcher, founder of the Institute for Peace and Security Studies in 2007
Zeragaber Gebrehiwot (born 1956), Ethiopian cyclist
Gebrehiwot Baykedagn (1886–1919), Ethiopian doctor, economist, and intellectual